Nanolestes is an extinct genus of mammals in the order Amphitheriida from the Late Jurassic of Eurasia. Two species, N. krusati and N. drescherae are known from the Alcobaça Formation in Portugal. Another species, N. mackennai, was described from the Oxfordian aged Qigu Formation of China by Thomas Martin, Alexander O. Averianov and Hans-Ulrich Pfretzschner in 2010.

References

Amphitheriida
Late Jurassic mammals of Europe
Jurassic Portugal
Fossils of Portugal
Lourinhã Formation
Late Jurassic mammals of Asia
Fossil taxa described in 2002
Prehistoric mammal genera